Michael Klosson (born August 22, 1949, in Washington, DC) is the former U.S. Ambassador to Cyprus and Save the Children’s Vice President for Policy and Humanitarian Response. For the State Department, he also served as U.S. Consul General to Hong Kong, principal deputy assistant secretary for legislative affairs, deputy chief of mission of the Embassy in Stockholm and Embassy in The Hague, and ambassador ad interim to the Netherlands and Sweden.

Klosson attended Hamilton College, graduating in 1971 and went on to earn an M.P.A. and M.A. from Princeton University.

References

Living people
People from Washington, D.C.
Hamilton College (New York) alumni
Princeton School of Public and International Affairs alumni
United States Foreign Service personnel
Ambassadors of the United States to Cyprus
Ambassadors of the United States to the Netherlands
Ambassadors of the United States to Sweden
American nonprofit executives
1949 births
Philanthropists from Washington, D.C.
Save the Children